John Derek Radford (formerly John Worboys; born June 1957) is a British convicted sex offender, known as the Black Cab Rapist. Worboys was convicted in 2009 for attacks on 12 women. Police say he may have had more than 100 victims.

Early life
Born in Enfield, Middlesex, Worboys left school with few qualifications and was employed in jobs including milkman, junior dairy manager and security guard. He lived alone in Rotherhithe, South London, before marrying Kate Santos in 1991; the couple separated after four years. Santos stated that he sexually assaulted her daughter and that he confessed to following home and assaulting another woman. He was in a relationship at the time of his arrest in 2008.

From 1987 to 2000, Worboys worked as a stripper, using "Terry the Minder" as a pseudonym. As "Paul" and "Tony", Worboys directed and appeared in a pornographic film. He hired out his flat in Poole, Dorset, for making pornographic films.

Worboys worked as a taxi driver in Bournemouth while living at his holiday flat in Poole.

Crimes and capture

Method
Worboys was a London black cab taxi driver who picked up women as fares late at night in central London. He would tell each woman he was celebrating coming into a large amount of money, usually by winning the lottery or at a casino, show her a carrier bag full of money to back up his story, and then suggest she drink a glass of champagne with him, which he had drugged with sedatives. After the drugs had taken effect, he would rape or sexually assault her. The women often had little memory of what happened to them.

Police investigation
The first reports to police concerning suspicious incidents experienced by women in black cabs dated from 2002. Over a period of six years, 14 women between 18 and 34 years of age went to the police to tell of the assault or other worrying experiences in a taxi, all of which had similarities. The police failed to link them.

Worboys was arrested for the sexual assault of a 19-year-old student in July 2007 and held at a police station in Plumstead, southeast London, but was released on bail after police believed his protests that she had been drunk and kissed him as she left his cab, which was confirmed by CCTV footage.

Physical evidence
Police found a "rape kit" in the boot of Worboys' Fiat Punto, containing champagne miniatures, plastic gloves, a torch, vibrators, condoms, sleeping tablets and an ashtray he used to crush drugs. In a safe in Worboys' garage police found hand-written notes outlining his planned explanations if he was questioned again following his 2007 arrest. These papers were not used in court because he claimed to have written them for his solicitor.

Worboys' DNA was recovered from a semen stain in one woman's underwear, a wristband belonging to another woman was found in his house and a third woman's address was found in his notebook. Forensic evidence linked a vibrator found in his car to another survivor.

Trial
Worboys pleaded not guilty to all 23 counts brought against him. Fourteen women testified in court. Worboys claimed to have engaged in "banter" with the women "to get their attention", due to not getting "attention and cuddles" when growing up. He said that any sex was consensual.

His defence counsel described Worboys as an "oddball", a "weird customer" and a "socially inadequate individual", but told the jury it did not mean Worboys was guilty, saying: "What have the prosecution got? They have got a lot of young women who had a very strange experience in the back of a taxi. It is not normal to be offered a drink by a taxi driver. The temptation for the jury is to say he is weird, he must have done it. Don’t fall into that trap".

Verdict and sentencing
Worboys was convicted at Croydon Crown Court on 13 March 2009 of one count of rape, five sexual assaults, one attempted assault and 12 drugging charges, committed from July 2007 to February 2008. He was cleared of two counts of drugging. He was sent for a pre-sentencing report and a psychiatric report, and was sentenced on 21 April. He received an indeterminate sentence of  imprisonment for public protection with the minimum custodial term set at eight years.

Mr Justice Penry-Davey said he would not be released until the parole board decided he no longer presented a threat to women. The judge ordered that Worboys should be banned from driving a passenger vehicle for profit.

Subsequent developments

Inquiry into the police investigation
 
The commander of Greenwich police, Chris Jarratt, 49, was moved on due to failings in this inquiry and an unrelated murder investigation. A spokeswoman for Women Against Rape said,  "We hope that some senior officers will face dismissal over this and similar cases". The handling of Worboys' case was brought before the Independent Police Complaints Commission, who concluded that proper investigations could have prevented some of the attacks. Worboys' case was followed by criticisms about the police in connection with another prolific serial sex offender Kirk Reid, who escaped apprehension despite being connected with a string of sex crimes four years before his arrest.

Five officers had complaints against them upheld, but all were allowed to remain in their jobs. This decision was criticised by one of the survivors and her lawyers, who say that she was laughed at by the police when she reported her assault. Following this case, the Metropolitan Police created a central intelligence unit to investigate serial sex offenders.

Later developments
By October 2010, the Metropolitan Police had received 102 additional complaints from women in London and Dorset, and believe that in 13 years as a taxi driver he could have drugged and attacked more than 100 female passengers. In a statement following the verdict, the police called for any other women who may have been attacked by Worboys to come forward.

Two unnamed women, who were sexually assaulted by Worboys, received damages from the Metropolitan Police in February 2014 after it was concluded their human rights had been breached by "inhuman or degrading treatment" during the police investigation. The Met lost its appeal against the decision in 2015. As a result of this case, a hearing was held at the Supreme Court in March 2017 to establish whether survivors should be able to sue the police under the 1998 Human Rights Act's Article 3 (under which it was decided to pay damages to the two women).

Proposed release and legal challenge
On 4 January 2018, the BBC reported that Worboys was to be released from prison. Worboys, who was by now 60 years old, had spent 10 years in custody including a period on remand. After a hearing about his case in November 2017, the Parole Board had decided to approve his release with "stringent" licence conditions. He would have to report to probation staff every week and was barred from contacting any of his survivors. Worboys' period on licence would last for at least ten years and he could be sent back to prison if he breached any licence conditions.

The following day, Nick Hardwick, the chairman of the Parole Board, apologised "unreservedly" after it was reported that some of Worboys' survivors had not been informed about his pending release and The Guardian reported that Richard Scorer, the lawyer for several of Worboys's alleged survivors whose cases were not included in the original criminal prosecution was ready to bring fresh prosecutions against him. On 28 March 2018 Hardwick resigned as Parole Board chair following a successful legal challenge, quashing its decision to release Worboys.

In November 2018, it was announced that Worboys would remain in prison.

Further charges
On 1 May 2019, Worboys was charged with four further sexual offences alleged to have occurred between 2000 and 2008, following a review of evidence by the Crown Prosecution Service. A hearing date was set for 23 May. In June 2019 he admitted the attacks on four women.

On 17 December 2019, Worboys was sentenced to two life sentences with a minimum term of six years for attacking the four women; the earliest of the offences occurred in 2000, five years before previously known attacks. It was revealed in court that Worboys had confessed to a psychologist that he had pushed alcohol on 90 women, of whom a quarter had been drugged.

See also
Effects and aftermath of rape
Laws regarding rape
List of serial rapists

References

1957 births
Living people
21st-century English criminals
British people convicted of sexual assault
British taxi drivers
Criminals from London
Date of birth missing (living people)
English male criminals
English people convicted of drug offences
English people convicted of rape
English prisoners and detainees
People from Enfield, London
Prisoners and detainees of England and Wales
Rape in London
Rape in the 2000s
Taxis of London